In mathematics, the Segre class is a characteristic class used in the study of cones, a generalization of vector bundles. For vector bundles the total Segre class is inverse to the total Chern class, and thus provides equivalent information; the advantage of the Segre class is that it generalizes to more general cones, while the Chern class does not.
The Segre class was introduced in the non-singular case by Segre (1953)..
In the modern treatment of intersection theory in algebraic geometry, as developed e.g. in the definitive book of Fulton (1998), Segre classes play a fundamental role.

Definition 

If  is of pure dimension  over  then this is given by:

Relation to Chern classes for vector bundles

For a holomorphic vector bundle  over a complex manifold  a total Segre class  is the inverse to the total Chern class , see e.g. Fulton (1998).

Explicitly, for a total Chern class

 

one gets the total Segre class

 

where

 

While the Chern class c(E) is written as

where  is an elementary symmetric polynomial of degree  in variables 

the Segre for the dual bundle  which has Chern roots  is written as

Expanding the above expression in powers of  one can see that  is represented by
a complete homogeneous symmetric polynomial of

Properties 
Here are some basic properties.
For any cone C (e.g., a vector bundle), .
For a cone C and a vector bundle E,

If E is a vector bundle, then
 is the identity operator.
 for another vector bundle F.
If L is a line bundle, then , minus the first Chern class of L.
If E is a vector bundle of rank , then, for a line bundle L,

A key property of a Segre class is birational invariance: this is contained in the following. Let  be a proper morphism between algebraic schemes such that  is irreducible and each irreducible component of  maps onto .

A basic example of birational invariance is provided by a blow-up.

where we used the notation . Thus,

Examples

Example 1 
Let Z be a smooth curve that is a complete intersection of effective Cartier divisors  on a variety X. Assume the dimension of X is n + 1.

Example 2 
The following is Example 3.2.22. of Fulton (1998). It recovers some classical results from Schubert's book on enumerative geometry.

where  are the tautological sub and quotient bundles. With , we have  and so, using Chern class#Computation formulae,

and thus

where  The coefficients in  have the enumerative geometric meanings; for example, 92 is the number of conics meeting 8 general lines.

See also: Residual intersection#Example: conics tangent to given five conics.

Example 3 
Let X be a surface and  effective Cartier divisors on it. For simplicity, suppose  meet only at a single point P with the same multiplicity m and that P is a smooth point of X. Then

To see this, consider the blow-up  of X along P and let , the strict transform of Z. By the formula at #Properties,

Since  where , the formula above results.

Multiplicity along a subvariety 
Let  be the local ring of a variety X at a closed subvariety V codimension n (for example, V can be a closed point). Then  is a polynomial of degree n in t for large t; i.e., it can be written as  the lower-degree terms and the integer  is called the multiplicity of A.

References

Bibliography
  

Intersection theory
Characteristic classes